Velit Bay Plantation is a plantation on the east coast of Espiritu Santo, Vanuatu. It lies on Velit Bay, and consists of over 1600 acres of plantation and forest.
The plantation caters to tourists and contains a restaurant.

References

External links
Official site

Tourist attractions in Vanuatu
Sanma Province
Espiritu Santo